Buzon may refer to:

People
 Manuel Buzón (1904–1954), Argentinian tango musician
 Patricio Buzon (born 1950), Filipino priest

Places
 Buzon, Hautes-Pyrénées, France
 Villers-Buzon, Doubs, France